Quigley Stadium may refer to:

Quigley Stadium (Little Rock), a high school football stadium in Little Rock, Arkansas
Quigley Stadium (West Haven), a baseball stadium in West Haven, Connecticut